Club Santos Laguna S.A. de C.V., commonly known as Santos Laguna or Santos, is a Mexican professional football club that competes in the Liga MX. It is located in northern Mexico and represents the urban area of La Comarca Lagunera, made up of the surrounding municipalities of Torreón, Gómez Palacio , Lerdo and Matamoros .

Santos Laguna was founded in 1983 and reached Mexico's top division after buying the Ángeles de Puebla club. The club debuted in first division in the 1988–89 season. Domestically, Santos Laguna has won 6 Liga MX championships, as well as 1 Copa MX and 1 Campeón de Campeones cup. It has also reached the finals of the CONCACAF Champions League twice, finishing runners-up on both occasions.

Santos is the third football club formed in the Laguna region, after the unsuccessful Laguna FC and FC Torreón. In 2018, the club celebrated its 35th anniversary with a change in their logo. In a February 17, 2013 poll, by Consulta Mitofsky, it was the fifth-most-popular team in Mexico.

History

Formation and early years
Santos Laguna was founded in 1983 by the Mexican Social Security Institute (IMSS) of the state of Durango as Santos IMSS. Since the late 1970s, the IMSS had sponsored a national football tournament with teams from across the country. Jose Diaz Couder, IMSS head of social services in Gómez Palacio, was invited to participate in the tournaments despite the fact that he did not have a team. He appealed to the players he knew to form a team, based on Asturias F.C.

In 1987 Tuberos de Veracruz, part of the Segunda División de México, was purchased by IMSS and moved to Santa Cruz, Tlaxcala. The first Santos Laguna team spent less than a year in Tlaxcala before moving to Gómez Palacio. A lack of facilities spurred efforts to obtain Moctezuma Stadium (Estadio Corona) in Torreon, owned by John Abusaid, and the Saints made their first home in the former Estadio Corona. On September 4, 1988 Los Guerreros played their first game as Santos Laguna, winning 2–0.

Segunda Division A
When the IMSS sold its professional sports clubs, Salvador Necochea Sagi bought Santos Laguna. In their first year in the Second Division A, the Warriors avoided relegation with three wins, two draws and one loss. William (the Clash) Galindo, Carlos González, Julio Cesar Armendáriz, Tomas Moreno and Fernando de la Rosa were notable players.

In 1989 Los Guerreros earned their nickname when, after a poor start, they finished 10th. Their fan base grew, and the club's owners bought the first Estadio Corona. The club underwent changes the following year, replacing its logo with the current one and playing in green and white stripes. Of the 18 founding members of the Second Division B, two won promotion to the first division: the Autonomous University of Tamaulipas and Santos Laguna.

Promotion to Primera Division

In 1988 Santos Laguna purchased the Puebla Angels, giving them Cristian Saavedra, Wilson Graniolatti, Martin Zuniga and Miguel Herrera and a record of three wins, four draws and one loss. Lucas Ochoa scored the club's first First Division goal and the Warriors, led by Carlos Ortiz, avoided relegation with Herrera's two goals paving the way for a 3–1 defeat of Atletico in Potosino.

In 1991, Grupo Modelo became majority owner of the club and Ramon Ramirez made his First Division debut with a goal against Club Deportivo Guadalajara. Late the following year, club president Armando Navarro Gascón and his wife were killed in an automobile accident.

President Alberto Canedo and Chilean coach Pedro García arrived in 1993. Grupo Modelo made a strong investment in reinforcements, Antonio "El Turco" Apud, Daniel Guzmán, Olaf Heredia, Diego Silva, Héctor Adomaitis and Richard Zambrano who joined players coming from Second Division such as José Guadalupe Rubio and Pedro Muñoz. The 1993–94 season saw the team for the first time qualify for the playoffs in the First Division and managed to reach the final coinciding with their tenth anniversary of founding, though lost in overtime in the second leg of the final against Club Deportivo Estudiantes Tecos who were coached by Victor Manuel Vucetich.

In 1994, key player Ramón Ramírez left for Guadalajara but Santos qualified for the playoffs a second time. Los Guerreros participated in the 1995 CONCACAF Champions Cup, and were eliminated in the first round by Deportivo FAS of El Salvador. Argentine Mauro Camoranesi played 13 games with Santos, scoring one goal before returning to Uruguay. Other notable players that season and the following one were Gabriel Caballero, Francisco Gabriel de Anda and Miguel España.

Chilean Cristian Montecinos reached the third league during the 1996 regular season, and Santos Laguna won their first First División title with new player Jared Borghetti. In the Verano 1997 tournament, Santos Laguna was eliminated by Guadalajara 5–0 in the Estadio Jalisco. Santos Laguna played poorly in the Invierno 1997 tournament, winning three games out of 17 and tied for last in the standings with Pumas UNAM and UAG Tecos. In 1998 the club reached one of the two qualifying finals for the Copa Libertadores, which was played on September 9 in Los Angeles.

2000s

In the summer 2000 season, Santos Laguna was strengthened by the arrivals of Rodrigo Ruiz and Luis Romero. During the regular season, the Warriors lost only two games and finished second in the overall standings behind Toluca.

In the 2001 summer season, the club won their second league championship. During the winter 2001 season Santos Laguna, with eight losses, failed to qualify for the playoffs and finished eighth overall. In summer 2002, the Warriors were fourth in the overall standings but were eliminated 1–0 in the semi-finals by Necaxa at the Estadio Corona. Santos Laguna qualified for the CONCACAF Champions Cup that year for the second time. The Warriors defeated Tauro FC of Panama by aggregate score of 5–3; in the next round, at home, Santos Laguna lost 3–2 overall to the U.S. champion Kansas City Wizards. At the end of the summer tournament, Fernando Quirarte and his coaching staff stepped down; Quirarte was replaced by Sergio Bueno, who was soon sacked in favor of Luis Fernando Tena. Finishing eighth overall, Santos Laguna defeated defending champion and leader Global America 5–4 at Azteca Stadium. The Warriors qualified for the group stage of the Merconorte Cup, defeating the Kansas City Wizards and Barcelona of Guayaquil twice each and Sporting Cristal once; their only loss was to Sporting Cristal, 2–1.

For the 2003 Apertura tournament (the club's 20th anniversary) reinforcements arrived in the form of Vicente Matias Vuoso and Sixto Peralta, Argentines who had played for Manchester City and Inter Milan. In the match at Estadio Corona against Monterrey, 10 goals were scored. The Warriors qualified for the playoffs, but were eliminated in the quarter-finals, Luis Fernando Tena's contract was not renewed, and he was replaced by Eduardo De la Torre.

The Warriors began 2004 well, qualifying for the Copa Libertadores by defeating Atlas Guadalajara 4–3, but were injured, inconsistent and tired in the Clausura. The club, put up for sale, was in a precarious financial position but played two tournaments and finished 14th overall. In the Copa Libertadores, despite unpaid wages, Santos Laguna ended the group stage undefeated. In the second round, the Warriors were eliminated by River Plate after a struggle.

During Apertura 2004 the club was abandoned by the Ministry of Finance, who withdrew financial support and returned it to former owner Grupo Modelo with instructions not to invest more money in the franchise until current owner Carlos Ahumada Kurtz solved his legal problems. The club payroll was restructured, players were cut and Santos Laguna did not qualify for the playoffs.

In the 2005 Clausura, the Warriors' Vicente Matias Vuoso won the scoring championship with 15 points and Rodrigo Ruiz set a Mexican record for scoring passes with 12 assists. Santos Laguna was plagued by injuries during the Apertura tournament. The Clausura 2006 tournament was disastrous for the club.

The Apertura 2007 was one of the team's best seasons. With the arrival of the Ecuadorian Christian Benitez, Santos Laguna lost only one match and was visited by Pele.
For the Clausura 2008, the club scored 36 goals in the regular season. On June 1, 2008 Santos Laguna won their third Clausura championship, defeating Cruz Azul. The club began Apertura 2008 at Azteca Stadium against America.

Clausura 2009 was disastrous for the Warriors; coach Daniel Guzman was dismissed and replaced by Sergio Bueno, and the club's fortunes improved somewhat. In the CONCACAF Champions League quarter-finals against the Montreal Impact in Montreal's Olympic Stadium before a crowd of 55,571, the Impact surprised and won 2–0. Apertura 2009 opened the Nuevo Estadio Corona; Bueno was dismissed and replaced by Ruben Omar Romano.

2010s

In 2010 Santos fell just short of the title, losing 4–3 to Toluca. For the Apertura Christian Benitez returned to the club, contributing to their rise to the top of the table and scoring 14 goals. The Saints lost 3–0 to Monterrey, their second consecutive final loss.
In the Clausura Ruben Omar Romano, unpopular with fans, was dismissed on February 20, 2011. Two days later, Diego Cocca debuted as coach in a 2–0 loss to Cruz Azul. Cocca lost his first six games before a 3–0 Week 12 victory over Cruz Azul, and the team did not qualify for the playoffs.

Cocca began Apertura 2011 with the support of the board and players, but was dismissed on September 3 and Eduardo Rergis became the interim coach. On September 12 Benjamin Galindo was appointed as new coach, with Hector Lopez his assistant. Under Galindo, Santos won five consecutive games and reached fourth place.

In the 2011–12 CONCACAF Champions League, Santos defeated the Seattle Sounders FC in the quarter-finals and Toronto FC in the semi-finals. In the final, the club lost to Rayados of Monterrey. In the 2012 Clausura, Santos Laguna finished in first place for the second time in its history. In the quarter-finals, the club won 6–4 on aggregate. The first game of the semi-finals, against the UANL Tigres at the Estadio Universitario, ended in a 1–1 draw and Santos won the second game to advance to the final. After playing Monterrey to a 1–1 draw at Estadio Tecnologico, Santos Laguna won the second game 2–1 with goals by Daniel Ludueña and Oribe Peralta for the club's fourth title.

The Apertura 2012 featured Edgar Gerardo Lugo and rising defensive stars Monarcas Morelia and Oswaldo Alanis. However, Santos did not qualify for the playoffs and was unable to repeat its championship. At the end of the season, Benjamín Galindo sacked his two assistants before he himself was dismissed.

In the Clausura 2013, Portuguese manager Pedro Caixinha was hired based on a recommendation by former Real Madrid coach Jose Mourinho. Daniel Ludueña and Christian Suarez were transferred to the Pachuca Soccer Club in exchange for Mauro Cejas, Nestor Calderon and promising Colombian Andres Renteria. Santos Laguna finished sixth during the regular season. They defeated Atlas 3–1 on aggregate in the quarter-finals and lost to Cruz Azul 0–3 and 2–1 in the semi-finals. In the 2012–13 CONCACAF Champions League, Santos again reached the final against Club de Fútbol Monterrey. The first game was a scoreless tie, and Monterrey won the second game 4–2.

For the Apertura 2013, Santos sold Ivan Estrada to Pachuca and transferred Herculez Gomez, Gerardo Lugo and Aaron Galindo. After the June purchase of Grupo Modelo by Belgian-Brazilian company AB InBev, on August 8 Grupo Modelo announced the sale of Santos Laguna to new company Orlegi Sports (led by Alejandro Irarragorri and other Mexican businessmen). The new owners said that they would continue their sponsorship.

After defeating Atlante 3–1 in the latter half of the Apertura 2013, Santos Laguna secured a berth in the Copa Libertadores for the second time in their history. Los Guerreros finished undefeated at the top of Group 8, which included Copa Argentina winners Arsenal de Sarandí, Uruguayan league champions Peñarol and Venezuelan league runners-up Deportivo Anzoátegui. In the away leg of the Round of 16, Santos Laguna faced Argentinian side Lanús, which they lost 2-1. Darwin Quintero scored the only goal for Los Laguneros. Los Guerreros sealed their elimination by losing 2-0 in the home leg after Ismael Blanco and Paolo Goltz scored for the Argentinian side. Following the two clashes in the tournament, several Lanús players were transferred to Santos Laguna in the latter months of the year, namely defender Carlos Izquierdoz, midfielder Diego "Pulpo" González and goalkeeper Agustín Marchesín.

In the Clausura 2015, Santos rebounded from a six-match losing streak to qualify for the playoffs. The club defeated top-ranked Tigres UANL 2–1 on aggregate to reach the semi-finals. They faced another favorite, Chivas del Guadalajara, whom they defeated 3–0 on aggregate. In the finals they faced Gallos Blancos del Querétaro in their first Liga MX final. Santos defeated Querétaro in the first leg of the finals at Territorio Santos Modelo with a record-breaking score of 5–0; Javier "Chuletita" Orozco scored four of the goals. In the second leg, at Corregidora Stadium, Gallos won 3–0 but Santos won their fifth championship 5–3 on aggregate.

In the Clausura 2018 tournament, under the management of former goalkeeper Robert Dante Siboldi, Santos Laguna earned twenty-nine points, tied with América and Monterrey, but placed fourth due to goal difference. In the playoffs, the team faced defending champions Tigres UANL and lost 2-0 in the first leg of the quarterfinals. In the second leg, Santos Laguna played with ten players for most of the match as Jonathan Rodriguez was sent off in the 28th minute but managed to win 2-0 and advance to the semi-finals. At this stage, Los Guerreros defeated América 6-3 on aggregate and qualified for the finals against league leader Toluca. In the final first leg, played in Estadio Corona, both Djaniny Tavares and Julio Furch netted for Santos Laguna, helping the team defeat Toluca 2-1. In the second leg, Furch scored in the 10th minute but Toluca's Gabriel Hauche levelled in the final minutes of the match, which finished 1-1. Santos Laguna earned its sixth league title, whilst Djaniny Tavares finished the tournament as the top goal scorer, netting fourteen times, the eighth time a Santos Laguna player has achieved this feat.

The team qualified for the sixth time for the CONCACAF Champions League, in the 2019 edition. In the Round of 16, Los Guerreros achieved an 11-2 win on aggregate against Honduran side Marathón. In the following stage, Santos Laguna defeated the New York Red Bulls in both legs, by 2-0 and 4-2 respectively. In the semi-finals, however, the team lost 5-3 on aggregate against Tigres UANL and failed to advance to the finals.

Notable players

1993–94 Runners-up
In the first leg, the team defeated Tecos UAG 1–0 at Corona Stadium; in the second leg, they lost 2–0 at 3 de Marzo Stadium.

Squad
  Adrián Marmolejo
  Ramón Ramírez
  Hector Adomaitis
  Diego Silva
  Antonio Apud
  Daniel Guzmán
  Richard Zambrano
  Felipe de Jesús Amezcua
  Jose Antonio Alcantara
  Jesús Gómez
  Ricardo Wagner de Souza
  Pedro Muñoz

Invierno 1996 champions
In Invierno 1996 Santos Laguna won its first title, defeating Necaxa 4–3 on aggregate (first leg 0–1 and second leg 4–2). The winning goal was controversial, with Jared Borgetti allegedly offside.

Squad
  José Miguel
  Francisco Gabriel de Anda
  Pedro Muñoz
  José Guadalupe Rubio
  Ricardo Wagner de Souza
  Nicolás Ramírez
  Miguel España
  Benjamín Galindo
  Héctor Adomaitis
  Jared Borgetti
  Gabriel Caballero
  Francisco Del Rio

Verano 2001 champions
In Verano 2001, Santos Laguna won its second title 4–3 on aggregate (first leg 1–2, second leg 3–1) against Pachuca.

Squad
  Adrián Martínez
  Héctor Altamirano
  Héctor López
  Miguel Ángel Carreón
  Mariano Trujillo
  Carlos Cariño
  Luis Romero
  Johan Rodríguez
  Rodrigo Ruiz
  Joaquín Reyes Chávez
  Jared Borgetti
  Guto
  Róbson Luíz
  Luis Fernando Soto
  Ignacio Vázquez
  Enrique Vizcarra

Clausura 2008 champions
In Clausura 2008 Santos became champions by defeating Monterrey in Monterrey with a last-minute goal in the semi-finals and Cruz Azul by an aggregate score of 3–2.

Squad
  Oswaldo Sánchez
  Iván Estrada
  Rafael Figueroa
  Fernando Ortiz
  Edgar Castillo
  Osmar Mares
  Juan Pablo Santiago
  Johnny García
  Jorge Barrera
  Juan Pablo Rodríguez
  Fernando Arce
  Francisco Torres
  Walter Jiménez
  Daniel Ludueña
  Christian Benítez
  Vicente Matías Vuoso
  Oribe Peralta
  Agustín Herrera

Clausura 2012 champions
In Clausura 2012 Santos won their fourth championship, defeating Tigres in the semi-finals with two last-minute goals, and defeating Monterrey in the finals with an aggregate score of 3–2.

Squad
  Oswaldo Sánchez
  Iván Estrada
  Felipe Baloy
  Aarón Galindo
  Osmar Mares
  Marc Crosas
  Rodolfo Salinas
  Carlos Darwin Quintero
  Christian Benitez
  Juan Pablo Rodríguez
  Daniel Ludueña
  Oribe Peralta
  César Ibáñez
  Rafael Figueroa
  Cándido Ramírez
  Herculez Gomez

Sponsors

Santos Laguna has always worn green, with white or black accessories. Their uniform originated after the acquisition of Angeles de Puebla and their sponsorship by the Mexican Social Security Institute during the 1983–84 season.

The first home uniform was white with green sleeves and a green vertical stripe, green shorts and socks; the away uniform was white, in tribute to Club Torreon. In 1986, they adopted a home uniform of green-and-white horizontal stripes, green shorts and white socks and a white-and-green away uniform. In 2000, Santos Laguna signed a sponsorship agreement with Soriana.

Kit

Grounds

Corona Stadium

Corona Stadium, in Torreón, Coahuila, was one of the smallest football stadiums in Mexico with a capacity of 20,100. Known as Montezuma Stadium, it opened on July 2, 1970, for a friendly match between the now-defunct CF Torreón and Guadalajara. The stadium was demolished on November 2, 2009.

New Corona Stadium
Santos Laguna plays at the $100 million Estadio Corona, with a capacity of 30,050. Construction began on February 22, 2008, and on November 11, 2009, the stadium opened for a friendly match between Santos Laguna and Santos FC from the Brazilian Série A. The sellout crowd included Mexican president Felipe Calderón and Brazilian legend Pelé. Santos Laguna won, 2–1.

Symbols

Insignia

Santos Laguna's home colors are green and white. When Santos Laguna was founded in 1983, its crest was white with green stripes and letters (similar to that of Santos FC). In 1991, when Grupo Modelo bought the club, the crest became similar to the current one. In 1996, a star was added to the badge after winning their first title in the Invierno 1996 tournament. After winning their second title in 2001, another star was added and switched to a darker shade of green with a black outline. As of 2012, the stars have been placed outside of the badge. In 2018, the club used a special badge, incorporating the number '35' for the club's 35th anniversary. A sixth star was added after winning the Clausura 2018 tournament.

Songs
In 1991, when the club was in danger of relegation to the second division, Santos adopted their first team song: "Es hora de ganar", by Ricardo Serna. In April 1994, Serna wrote "Santos Campeon". Two years later, Chilean composer Martin Ibarreche Wilt Labarca was commissioned to write "Verdiblanco el corazon". In 1997 Serna wrote "Hymn to the Fans", and in May 2001 the club introduced "Venceremos". Yahir of La Academia sang a song celebrating the club's 25th anniversary.

Partnerships

On December 9, 2010, Santos formed a partnership with Scottish champions Celtic. Like Celtic, Santos wear a green-and-white hooped kit and the clubs regularly mention each other on Twitter and Facebook. On January 10, 2013, Santos formed a partnership with Atlético Nacional.

Rivalries
Santos has a regional rivalry with state neighbors Monterrey, with whom they played finals in the First Division of Mexico and two finals in the CONCACAF Champions League. To a lesser extent Santos also has a rivalry with Tigres UANL.

Honours

Domestic

Seasons

Personnel

Management

Coaching staff
Source:

Managers

Players

First team

Retired numbers

 58 –  Jared Borgetti, Forward (1996 - 2006)

On loan

Reserve teams

Player records

Top scorers
Primera División
  Gabriel Caballero (Verano 1997; 13)
  Jared Borgetti (Invierno 2000; 19)
  Jared Borgetti (Verano 2001; 22)
  Vicente Matías Vuoso (Clausura 2005; 16)
  Vicente Matías Vuoso (Apertura 2005; 11)
  Christian Benítez (Apertura 2010; 14)
  Djaniny (Clausura 2018; 14)

Copa Mexico
  Richard Zambrano (1994–95 Copa Mexico; 3)
  Andrés Rentería (Apertura 2014 Copa MX; 6)

International
  Oribe Peralta (2011–12 CONCACAF Champions League; 7)
  Darwin Quintero (2012–13 CONCACAF Champions League; 6)

All-time records
 Updated March 6, 2019.

Management

See also

 Santos FC
 Santos FC and the Brazil national football team
 Santos FC Reserves and Academy
 Torcida Jovem

References

External links

 Official website
 Santos Laguna Official Facebook
 Santos Laguna Official Twitter
 Santos Laguna YouTube
 Santos Laguna Flickr
 Super Santos Laguna
 Federacion Mexicana de Futbol

 
Football clubs in Coahuila
Association football clubs established in 1983
Liga MX teams
1983 establishments in Mexico
Torreón